Gubernatorial elections were held in the Philippines on May 10, 2010. All provinces elected their provincial governors for three-year terms that will begin on June 30, 2010. Governors that are currently serving their third consecutive terms are prohibited from running as governors (they may run in any other position).

Highly urbanized cities and independent component cities such as Zamboanga City, Angeles City and Cebu City, and including Metro Manila and the municipality of Pateros are outside the jurisdiction of any province and thus won't elect for governors of their mother provinces (Pampanga and Cebu, for Angeles and Cebu City). They, along with Metro Manila would elect mayors instead.

Background
Lakas-Kampi-CMD, the merged party of Lakas-CMD and KAMPI of President Gloria Macapagal-Arroyo, has a majority of the provincial governorships in the lead-up to the 2010 elections. The Liberal Party (Philippines) was a far second. However, with the resolution of pending disputed election results by the Commission on Elections (COMELEC), the Liberals lost three more governorships.  Attracting international attention is the election race for governor of Maguindanao where Esmael Mangudadatu will be competing after a rival clan kidnapped and murdered 57 people including his wife, sisters, aides, and lawyers, plus several journalists.

Bulacan
On December 1, 2009, the COMELEC's Second Division ruled that Roberto Pagdanganan defeated Jonjon Mendoza in the 2007 elections, with Pagdanganan garnering 342,295 votes, 4,231 votes over Mendoza. Mendoza was a member of KAMPI prior to switching to the Liberals, and Pagdanganan was a member of Lakas-CMD before joining the Nacionalista Party. Mendoza and Pagdanganan won't contest the governorship; Pagdanganan is running for Congress as representative of Bulacan's 1st district, while Mendoza is running as representative from Bulacan's 3rd district, while her sister, former governor Josefina Dela Cruz will run as her brother's replacement.

Isabela
In Isabela, Grace Padaca of the Liberal Party defeated Benjamin "Ben" Dy of the Nationalist People's Coalition (NPC) via a margin of 17,007 votes, with Padaca garnering 237,128 votes and Dy having 220,121 votes. Padaca was proclaimed winner on June 30, the day of inauguration of all local officials.

On December 8, 2009, the COMELEC Second Division ruled that Dy defeated Grace Padaca by a margin of 1,051 votes, with Dy garnering 199,435 over Padaca's 198,384. Padaca previously defeated Benjamin's brother Faustino Jr. in the 2004 election, ending the Dy's three-decade long rule in Isabela.  This time, it's one of Ben's brothers, Faustino III also known as Bojie, who will contest Padaca in the 2010 gubernatorial election, with the ruling Lakas-Kampi-CMD party nominating him; while Ben on the other hand will vie for the mayorship of Cauayan instead.

Pampanga
Arroyo's home province of Pampanga had one of the most hotly contested gubernatorial elections in 2007, with three out of six candidates having a realistic chance of winning: then incumbent Mark Lapid (Lakas-CMD), board member Lilia Pineda (KAMPI) and Roman Catholic priest-on-leave Eddie Panlilio (Independent). Panlilio was proclaimed the winner, garnering 219,706 votes, with Pineda obtaining 218,559 and Lapid having 210,875 votes.

Pineda contested the result; meanwhile, Panlilio became a member of the Liberal Party late in 2009, supporting Noynoy Aquino's presidential campaign. On early February 2010, the COMELEC's Second Division ruled that Pineda won the 2007 election, obtaining 190,729 votes against Panlilio's 188,718.

Luzon

Ilocos Region

Ilocos Norte

Ilocos Sur

La Union

Pangasinan

Cagayan Valley

Batanes

Cagayan

Isabela

Nueva Vizcaya

Quirino

Cordillera Administrative Region

Abra

Apayao

Benguet

Ifugao

Kalinga

Mountain Province

Central Luzon

Aurora

Bataan

Bulacan

Nueva Ecija

Pampanga

Tarlac

Zambales

Calabarzon

Batangas

Cavite

Laguna

Quezon

Rizal

Mimaropa

Marinduque

Occidental Mindoro

Oriental Mindoro

Palawan

Romblon

Bicol Region

Albay

Camarines Norte

Camarines Sur

Catanduanes

Masbate

Sorsogon

Visayas

Western Visayas

Aklan

Antique

Capiz

Guimaras

Iloilo

Negros Occidental

Central Visayas

Bohol

Cebu

Negros Oriental

Siquijor

Eastern Visayas

Biliran

Eastern Samar

Leyte

Northern Samar

Samar

Southern Leyte

Mindanao

Zamboanga Peninsula

Zamboanga del Norte

Zamboanga del Sur

Zamboanga Sibugay

Northern Mindanao

Bukidnon

Camiguin

Lanao del Norte

Misamis Occidental

Misamis Oriental

Davao Region

Compostela Valley

Davao del Norte

Davao del Sur

Davao Oriental

Soccsksargen

Cotabato

Sarangani

South Cotabato

Sultan Kudarat

Caraga

Agusan del Norte

Agusan del Sur

Dinagat Islands

Surigao del Norte

Surigao del Sur

Autonomous Region in Muslim Mindanao

Basilan

Lanao del Sur

Maguindanao

Sulu

Tawi-Tawi

Notes

References

External links
Official website of the Commission on Elections

Results
Philippines 2010 Election Results - Main Site
Philippines 2010 Election Results - Alternate Site
PPCRV Map Viewer - PPCRV Encoded Site
PPCRV Map Viewer - PPCRV Site
NAMFREL - 2010 PARALLEL COUNT - NAMFREL Site
HALALAN 2010: Latest Comelec official results - ABS-CBN Site
ELEKSYON 2010: National Election Results Tally - GMA Site
ELEKSYON 2010: Regional Election Results Tally - GMA Site
The Vote 2010 Election Results Tally - Bombo Radyo Site

gubernatorial
2010
Philippine gubernatorial